"I'm Saving My Love" is a song written by Alex Zanetis and recorded by American country artist, Skeeter Davis in 1963.
Later in the year, the single was issued onto Davis' fifth studio album, Cloudy, with Occasional Tears.

"I'm Saving My Love" was recorded at the RCA Victor Studio in Nashville, Tennessee, United States on January 9, 1963. The session was produced by Anita Kerr. The song was released as a single in April 1963, serving as the follow-up to Davis' major country pop crossover hit, "The End of the World". "I'm Saving My Love" also became a top-ten hit, reaching number nine on the Billboard Magazine Hot Country Singles chart, while also just missing the top-forty on the Billboard Hot 100. In addition, the single reached number thirteen on the Hot Adult Contemporary Tracks chart, becoming Davis' second entry on that chart.

Chart performance

Other versions
A Hebrew version called Et Ahavati (My Love) was recorded in Israel in 1963 by Gila Adari.

References 

1963 songs
Skeeter Davis songs
1963 singles
RCA Victor singles
Songs written by Alex Zanetis